Stefano Galli is an electrical engineer working for ASSIA, Inc. in Redwood City, California. He was named a Fellow of the Institute of Electrical and Electronics Engineers (IEEE) in 2012 for his contributions to the theory, practice, and standardization of power line communication networks.

References

Fellow Members of the IEEE
Living people
Year of birth missing (living people)
Place of birth missing (living people)
American electrical engineers